Pselligmus is a genus of spiders in the family Nemesiidae. It was first described in 1892 by Simon. , it contains only one Brazilian species, Pselligmus infaustus.

References

Nemesiidae
Monotypic Mygalomorphae genera
Spiders of Brazil